E-58 is an advanced network infrastructure development effort encompassing communities throughout the Tobacco Region of Virginia, United States, along the line of U.S. Route 58. The Virginia Tobacco Indemnification and Community Revitalization Commission is managing e-58 for the economic development interest of the tobacco regions.

References

External links
eCorridors - Enhancing communities with the speed of light
eCorridors Community Broadband Access Map
Virginia Tech | Invent the Future
eCorridors.info

Virginia Tech
Blacksburg, Virginia
Danville, Virginia
Broadband